Timur Talgatuly Dosmagambetov (Timur Talğatūly Dosmağambetov; born 1 May 1989) is a Kazakhstani footballer who plays as a midfielder for Astana and the Kazakhstan national team.

Career

Club
On 11 July 2022, Astana announced the signing of Dosmagambetov.

International
Dosmagambetov made his international debut for Kazakhstan on 12 May 2015 in a friendly match against Burkina Faso, which finished as a 0–0 draw.

Career statistics

International

References

External links
 
 
 
 
 

1989 births
Living people
Sportspeople from Kokshetau
People from Kokshetau
Kazakhstani footballers
Kazakhstan under-21 international footballers
Kazakhstan international footballers
Association football midfielders
FC Okzhetpes players
FC Aktobe players
FC Vostok players
FC Taraz players
FC Tobol players
FC Ordabasy players
Kazakhstan Premier League players